"Remember Me" is a song recorded by American singer Jennifer Hudson and was released on March 3, 2017, by Epic Records. A midtempo ballad, "Remember Me" was written by Hudson, Jamie Hartman, Konstantin Sherer and Vincent Stein, with production by Hartman and Stein.

Background and promotion
Following the release of Hudson's third studio album JHUD in 2014, it was announced she had left RCA Records and had signed a new contract with Epic Records on June 28, 2016. Hudson said to Billboard magazine: "I couldn’t be more excited to embark on this new chapter with two of the most prolific musical legends of this generation, there is no doubt that this is just the beginning of a very special collaboration and I know that the result will be something unforgettable. I am looking forward to the creative process and sharing new music very soon!"

On March 2, 2017, a day before the song's release, Hudson released an audio clip of the song on her YouTube channel. On March 5, 2017, Hudson performed the song on The Voice UK.

Critical reception
The song was met with positive reviews from critics. Rap-Up stated in a review "The Oscar and Grammy winner flexes her powerful pipes on the rousing record, which she co-wrote with Jamie Hartman." Mike Wass from Idolator stated "Jennifer Hudson finally found the appropriate vehicle for those bone-rattling vocals on 'Remember Me', the first taste of the diva's fourth LP is soaring mid-tempo ballad with gut-wrenching lyrics".

Music video
The music video for "Remember Me" premiered on April 10, 2017.

Chart performance
In the United Kingdom, the song debuted at number sixty-seven on the UK Singles Downloads Chart on March 10, 2017. In its second week the song fell thirty-one places to number ninety-eight before falling out of the Top 100 downloads chart. The song re-entered the chart at number seventy-one on April 14, 2017. On April 21, 2017, the song reached its peak charting at number fifty-five.

In Scotland, the song debuted at number sixty on the Scottish Singles Chart. In its second week the song fell thirty-six places to number ninety-six. In its third week the song rose to four places charting at number ninety-two before falling out of the Top 100. The song re-entered the chart at number fifty-seven on April 14, 2017. On April 21, 2017, the song reached its peak, charting at number fifty.

Track listing
Digital download
"Remember Me" – 3:52

Digital download - The Remixes
"Remember Me" (Kat Krazy Remix) – 3:30
"Remember Me" (BAUT Remix) – 3:57
"Remember Me" (Ryan Riback Remix) – 3:27
"Remember Me" ("J-C" Carr Remix) – 4:48
"Remember Me" (Dave Audé Remix) – 3:46

Personnel 
Credits adapted from Tidal.

Jamie Hartman - acoustic guitar, background vocals, band leader, bass, keyboards, piano, strings
Jennifer Hudson - background vocals
Elizabeth Komba - background vocals
Nelson Raphael Beato, Jr. - background vocals
Lakeisha Lewis - background vocals
Jeremy Rubelino - band leader
Vanessa Freebairn-Smith - cello
Victor Lawrence - cello
Alisha Bauer - cello
Alex Williams - engineer
Joe LaPorta - mastering engineer
Konstantin Sherer - misc. producer, programmer
Michael Brauer - mixing engineer
Mark Robertson - other, violin
Matt Dyson - recording engineer
Jorge Velasco - recording engineer
Rodney Wirtz - viola
Grace Park - viola
Andrew Duckles - viola
Songa Lee - violin
Cheryl Kim - violin
Neli Nikolaeva - violin
Eugenia Choi - violin
Sam Fischer - violin

Charts

Release history

References

2017 singles
Jennifer Hudson songs
2017 songs
Epic Records singles
Songs written by Jamie Hartman
Songs written by Vincent Stein